Alexander Regis Comsia (born August 1, 1996) is a Canadian soccer player who last played for North Carolina FC in the USL Championship. He played college soccer for the North Carolina Tar Heels program. After his Senior season, Comsia was selected First team 2018 NCAA Men's Soccer All-Americans and the ACC Defender of the Year, two of the most prestigious individual awards in collegiate soccer.

Career

Club

North Carolina FC
After four outstanding years at the NCAA Division I University of North Carolina at Chapel Hill, including two consecutive College Cup appearances, Comsia was invited to the MLS Combine. After not getting drafted in the 2019 MLS SuperDraft, Comsia signed with North Carolina FC. He made his debut in their 2019 season opener against two-time defending USL Cup champion Louisville City, starting and playing full game in a 4–1 victory. On March 23, 2019, Comsia came in as a substitute to help his team secure a 2–1 victory vs Liga MX Club Necaxa. Comsia would return to the club in the 2020 season.

International
Comsia represented Canada at the under-17 level at the 2013 CONCACAF U-17 Championship where he played every minute to help the team win the bronze medal and qualify to the 2013 FIFA U-17 World Cup. He played again every minute in Dubai at the 2013 FIFA U-17 World Cup helping the team earn 3rd place in Group E with draws vs Austria (2–2) and Iran (1–1). Canada did not advance beyond the Group stage, losing its final game to eventual semifinalist Argentina. In February 2015 Comsia was the youngest player named to the Canadian under-20 team for the 2015 CONCACAF U-20 Championship. In June 2015 Comsia was again the youngest player named to the Canada U23 team for the 2015 Pan American Games where he started and played every minute in the inaugural game vs the Brazil national under-23 football team. Overall, Comsia represented Canada as a starter playing full game in over 30 international matches at the U23, U20 and U17 level, including against Mexico (4 times), Israel, Italy, Slovenia, Moldova, Azerbaijan, Morocco (2 times), USA (2 times), United Arab Emirates, Panama (3 times), Costa Rica (3 times), Trinidad and Tobago, Jamaica, Honduras, Russia (2 times), Austria, Iran, Argentina, China, Northern Ireland, England, Haiti, El Salvador and Brazil.

Honours

Individual
First team 2018 NCAA Men's Soccer All-Americans as selected by each of the United Soccer Coaches, Soccer America and College Soccer News.
ACC Defender of the Year: 2018
MAC Hermann Trophy Semifinalist (2018)
Senior CLASS Award Finalist: 2018
First team 2018 NCAA Division I Men's Soccer All-South Region as selected by the United Soccer Coaches
First team 2018 Atlantic Coast Conference men's soccer season
ACC Men's Soccer All-Tournament Team: 2018
ACC Men's Soccer Scholar-Athlete of the Year: 2018
First team 2018 College Soccer News Preseason All-American
MAC Hermann Trophy Watch List: 2018
2018 Premier Development League (PDL) Top 20 Prospects
2018 Premier Development League (PDL) Players Watch List

References

External links
 
 North Carolina Tar Heels Men's Soccer Profile

1996 births
Living people
Canada men's youth international soccer players
Canadian soccer players
Canadian people of Romanian descent
Canadian people of French descent
North Carolina FC players
North Carolina Tar Heels men's soccer players
Soccer players from Vancouver
Tobacco Road FC players
USL Championship players
USL League Two players
Association football defenders
All-American men's college soccer players
Footballers at the 2015 Pan American Games
Pan American Games competitors for Canada
2015 CONCACAF U-20 Championship players